The Shijing River is a small river in Fujian Province of China. The tidal estuary it forms when entering the Weitou Bay of the Taiwan Strait is known as the Anhai Bay. Most of the Shijing River's basin is within the Prefecture-level city of Quanzhou.

Sources
The sources of the Shijing River are in the hilly area near the border of Quanzhou's Nan'an City and Xiamen's Xiang'an District. The reservoir also has a 1 MW hydroelectric plant.

The lower course

The lower course of the Shijing River, and the Anhai Bay, form the border between Quanzhou's two county-level units: Nan'an City in the west and Jinjiang City in the east. The riverside towns on the west (Nan'an) bank are Shuitou and Shijing, and on the east (Jinjiang) bank, Anhai and Dongshi.

The famous Song-era Anping Bridge originally spanned the shallow Shijing estuary between Anhai and Shuitou. Over the intervening nine centuries, this part of the estuary has silted up, so that the bridge (now fully restored) is now in a lake of sorts, almost completely surrounded by dry land on all sides.

Anhai Bay

Further downstream, the Shijing River's estuary (the Anhai Bay) continues to exist. It is an important aquaculture area. 
As of ca. 2001, 138.5 hectares of the mudflats and water surface on the bay's western (Shuitou) side were used for aquaculture; this included 37.5 ha used for raising the blood cockles (Tegillarca granosa, 泥蚶), 58.3 ha used for the Chinese razor clam (Sinonovacula constricta, 缢蛏), 16.2 ha used for oyster farming, and 26.5 ha used for shrimp farming.
Over 1400 people from Shuitou's Gangnei Village were employed in aquaculture and fishing.

Notes

Rivers of Fujian
Quanzhou
Estuaries of China